Chaetostomella is a genus of fruit flies in the family Tephritidae.

Species
Chaetostomella alini Hering, 1936
Chaetostomella baezi Merz, 2000
Chaetostomella completa (Kapoor, Malla & Ghosh, 1979)
Chaetostomella cylindrica (Robineau-Desvoidy, 1830)
Chaetostomella erdenezuu (Dirlbekova, 1982)
Chaetostomella lenta Richter, 1975
Chaetostomella nigripunctata Shiraki, 1933
Chaetostomella rossica Hendel, 1927
Chaetostomella similis Chen, 1938
Chaetostomella sphenellina Hering, 1939
Chaetostomella steropea (Rondani, 1870)
Chaetostomella stigmataspis (Wiedemann, 1830)
Chaetostomella trimacula (Hering, 1939)
Chaetostomella undosa (Coquillett, 1899)
Chaetostomella vibrissata (Coquillett, 1898)
Chaetostomella zhuravlevi Basov, 2000

References

Tephritinae
Tephritidae genera
Diptera of Europe
Diptera of Asia
Diptera of North America